Flyboys or Flyboy may refer to

Airmen

Flyboys or Flyboy
Flyboys: A True Story of Courage, 2003 book
Flyboys (film), 2006 film
The Flyboys (film), 2008 film
Several characters in Maximum Ride, see List of characters in Maximum Ride
Flyboys (band), punk rock band

Fly Boy or Fly Boys
Smith's Fly Boys, paramilitary group formed during the 1741 New York slave revolt
Fly Boy, a song from the album I Need Mine
Fly Boy, In the Sky, a spinoff manga of Banana Fish
Fly Boy, an album by Crown J
"Fly Boy", a single by John Wesley (guitarist)

FlyBoy or FlyBoys
flyboy, an in-universe nickname for the fictional character Silverbolt (Beast Wars)

See also
 The Boy Who Could Fly